The Robin Hood is one of the four flagship named passenger trains operated by East Midlands Railway inherited from Midland Mainline in the UK.

History

The first use of the Robin Hood name was on 2 February 1959 when British Railways gave the name to the 0815 from Nottingham to London. Unusually, this avoided Leicester and stopped only at Manton. In the reverse direction however, it also stopped at Bedford, Wellingborough and Kettering.

The train lost its name at the end of the summer 1962 timetable.

As of 2016, there are two trains named Robin Hood:

As of 2019, the two trains named the Robin Hood were rescheduled to run as:

Neither train runs at weekends.

Prior to the timetable change on 14 December 2008 the Robin Hood was operated by a 7-car Class 222 Meridian on both the outward and return trip.

Current service

The current East Midlands Railway timetable has The Robin Hood running as:

the 0640 train from Lincoln to London St Pancras arriving at 0927 on weekday mornings operated by a 10-car Class 222 Meridian.
the 1735 train from London St Pancras to Nottingham arriving at 1913 on weekday evenings operated by a 10-car Class 222 Meridian.

Other named trains
East Midlands Railway operates three other named trains called:
Master Cutler
South Yorkshireman
Sheffield Continental

See also
Midland Mainline
East Midlands Railway
British Rail Class 222
InterCity 125

References

External links
East Midlands Trains website
National Rail Enquires website - main web portal for UK train fares, times and other travel information

Named passenger trains of British Rail
Railway services introduced in 1958
Railway services discontinued in 1962